The 1907 Ohio Green and White football team represented Ohio University in the 1907 college football season as an independent. Led by second-year head coach Arthur McFarland, the Green and White compiled a record of 3–4–1, being outscored 76–139.

Schedule

References

Ohio
Ohio Bobcats football seasons
Ohio Green and White football